Roycemore School is an independent, nonsectarian, co-educational college preparatory school located in Evanston, Illinois serving students in pre-kindergarten through Grade 12. The school's current enrollment is approximately 240 students as of 2021. The school's old building is listed on the National Register of Historic Places.

In 2022, for the state of Illinois, Niche ranked Roycemore School as the #1 most diverse private high school, the sixth-best private high school, and the fifth-best private K–12 school. The school currently has a six-to-one student-to-teacher ratio.

History
Roycemore School was founded in 1915 by Julia Henry and a group of North Shore parents at 640 Lincoln Street, Evanston, IL. Henry was originally the Lower School principal at the Girton School for Girls in Winnetka, IL, taking several faculty members and students with her to the new Roycemore. The school was named after Henry's grandfather, Andrew Royce, a Congregational minister in Barre, Vermont in the 1800s. The school took on the Royce family crest inspiring the blue and gold school colors, the motto "fortis et prudens simul," or strength and careful judgement go together, and the mascot, the griffin. In 1968, the first boy graduated, alone in a class of six.

Its original location was in north Evanston, Illinois, near Northwestern University. The former Roycemore School building was placed on the National Register of Historic Places in 1987.

In June 2013, long-time Headmaster Joseph Becker retired (1976-2013), having ushered in a new era of Roycemore in time for the school to celebrate its centennial throughout the 2015-2016 school year.

Relocation
As its property lease with Northwestern University for the lot at Lincoln St. and Orrington Ave. was due to end in 2014, in early 2000 the school began looking for another Evanston location that would allow room to continue a trend of enrollment growth that had occurred over the previous 10 years, with updated technology and to accommodate a larger, regulation-sized gymnasium.

Roycemore began classes at 1200 Davis Street in Evanston on January 6, 2012. The 3-acre lot, adjacent to Evanston's Alexander Park, was the location of a 55,000-square-foot building that was once the headquarters of the General Board of Pension Funds for the United Methodist Church. Roycemore completely renovated the building and added a nearly 8,000-square-foot gymnasium.

Athletics and Extracurriculars
The school has no-cut athletic teams starting in the fifth grade, including Basketball, Soccer, Fencing, Cross Country and Volleyball. Roycemore's website states, "Participation is given a higher priority than competing to win at all grade levels, but competing to win does take on increased focus as the participants become older."

Roycemore's mascot is the Griffin and the school colors are blue and gold.

Each year, Roycemore School holds its annual Palio, which is the school's oldest tradition.  Palio was modeled after the pageant that proceeds the Palio di Siena in Italy.  Students from grades 1–12 display the progress they have made in physical education classes during the year. The emphasis is on rhythmics, dance, gymnastics, and sports skills. Roycemore's Palio has a colorful procession, where each new Kindergarten class is handed down a banner with the coat of arms from the graduating Senior class that the younger students will carry until graduation in twelfth grade.

Another longstanding tradition at Roycemore is their tumbling program. Starting in third grade, students can be found participating in mounts, lifting other students, or flying through the air as part of their performance. The program culminates in three annual all-school performances, including Palio, for fellow students, parents and alumni.

Notable alumni
 Frances Badger (1904–1997), Works Progress Administration (WPA) artist. Badger was a notable artist in the Chicago area, featuring 17 works in the Art Institute of Chicago between 1927 and 1943. She also served as the president of the Chicago Society of Artists starting in 1942.
 Susan Garrett (1950–Present), Illinois State Senator. Garrett represented the 59th district of Illinois in the Illinois House of Representatives for 4 years before serving between 2003 and 2013 in the Illinois Senate.
 Andrew Goldberg (1968–Present), Emmy award-winning producer and director. Goldberg's works include documentaries, news, and long-form programming for PBS, ABC News, MSNBC and others. His work tackles public affairs, history, and current events, such as the Armenian genocide and contemporary anti-Semitism.
 Gloria Guardia (1940-2019), UNESCO Vice President of PEN International. Guardia was a Panamanian novelist, essayist, and journalist who has received global recognition. She was a Fellow at the Panamanian Academy of Letters and an Associate Fellow at the Spanish Royal Academy, the Columbian and the Nicaraguan Academy of Letters.
 Jason Narducy (1971–Present), American rock musician. Narducy started his music career with the rock band, Verboten. Dave Grohl of the Foo Fighters credits Verboten for inspiring him to pursue music. Narducy has also played in the band Verbow, and has most recently released music under a solo project called Split Single.
Geoff Mark (1967-Present),  Visual Effects Supervisor, Director and Writer. He is known for his work on Serenity (2005), Spectral (2016) and Spider-Man 3 (2007). He has been married to Wendy Wells since October 18, 1998.
Terry Gdoutos(1987 - present) Dr. Terry Gdoutos studies and develops novel technologies for deployable solar arrays, antennas, and integrated sunlight collection and power beaming arrays, enabling spacecraft to collect solar energy in space and wirelessly beam it to Earth, the Moon or other planets.

References

External links
 Roycemore School's Official Site

Schools in Evanston, Illinois
Private elementary schools in Cook County, Illinois
Private middle schools in Cook County, Illinois
Private high schools in Cook County, Illinois
Private K-12 schools in the United States
Preparatory schools in Illinois
Educational institutions established in 1915
1915 establishments in Illinois